Downloading the Repertoire is a 1996 novelty album by American singer John "Jack" Mudurian (May 23, 1929 – September 30, 2013).

Mudurian was a resident of Duplex Nursing Home in Boston, Massachusetts. In 1981, David Greenberger, an employee who also edited the zine The Duplex Planet, overheard Mudurian singing at a home talent show, and when Greenberger spoke to him about it, Mudurian boasted that he could sing as many songs as Frank Sinatra. Greenberger brought in a cassette tape recorder and asked him to sing; Mudurian proceeded to sing 129 songs, many from the Tin Pan Alley repertory (and several more than once), continuously over the next 47 minutes.

The recording was issued as Downloading the Repertoire on Arf! Arf! Records in 1996, and it became a cult novelty hit. Neil Strauss, writing about the recording for The New York Times, wrote: "What is most interesting about this CD is not Mr. Mudurian's slurred, rushed singing but the way his entire life story unfolds in his selection of material." In a review for AllMusic, Cub Koda commented: "[Mudurian's]... free association from tune to tune is downright astounding. No matter what kind of music you might have in your collection, it's a good bet you don't have anything that sounds quite like this." A reviewer for CMJ New Music Monthly described the album as "a hysterical, bizarre tour through the history of American popular song."

A shortened version of the music heard on Downloading appeared on Irwin Chusid's compilation of outsider music called Songs in the Key of Z, Vol. 1. Mudurian can also be heard on the compilations The Talent Show (1996), and The Tarquin Records All Star Holiday Extravaganza (2000). After meeting Mudurian, singer Jad Fair transcribed his version of "Chicago (That Toddlin' Town)" and performed it in his own live shows.

According to Greenberger, the nursing home at which Mudurian resided closed in 1987, and the two lost touch. Greenberger, who affectionately referred to the marathon recording session as "Jack's and my private Olympic event," recalled: "That June afternoon lives on for me. Planes flew overhead, birds chirped in the trees and another resident... could be heard singing in the background from time to time."

Songs sung on Downloading the Repertoire
(in order of songs sung)

Chicago (That Toddlin' Town)
It's Been a Long, Long Time
Why Am I Always Yearning for Theresa
The Halls of Montezuma
So Long It's Been Good to Know You
Step Right Up (and Help Old Uncle Sam)
It's Only a Paper Moon
Music! Music! Music! (Put Another Nickel In)
Take Me Out to the Ball Game
Some Sunday Morning
Any Bonds Today?
Red River Valley
My Bonnie
Jimmy Crack Corn
The Wabash Cannonball
I Wonder Who's Kissing Her Now
Ramona
Toot Toot Tootsie! (Goo' Bye)
If You Knew Susie Like I Know Susie
I Don't Care If the Sun Don't Shine
I Love My Baby (My Baby Loves Me)
I'll See You in My Dreams
Lucky Me
I Don't Know Why (I Just Do)
Near You
South of the Border (Down Mexico Way)
I've Been Working on the Railroad
Goody-Goody
Home on the Range
Joshua Fit the Battle of Jericho
Bell Bottom Trousers
Ragtime Cowboy Joe
Over the Rainbow
When You Wish Upon a Star
Pistol Packin' Mama
Frankie and Johnnie
Rudolph the Red-Nosed Reindeer
Jingle Bells
I Love You
Cuddle Up a Little Closer
Ain't She Sweet
Rose O'Day (The Filla-Ga-Dusha Song)
The Band Played On
Sparrow in the Treetop
"Pep Talk"/South of the Border (Down Mexico Way)
It's Only a Paper Moon
California, Here I Come
Row, Row, Row Your Boat
Singin' in the Rain
Five Foot Two, Eyes of Blue
Lullaby Of Broadway
I Wonder Who's Kissing Her Now
Some Sunday Morning
For Me and My Gal
Blue Skies
Smoke That Cigarette
Ain't Misbehavin'
Cheek to Cheek
Let's Call the Whole Thing Off
I've Got a Lovely Bunch of Coconuts (Roll or Bowl a Ball-A Penny a Pitch)
Michael Row the Boat Ashore
Row, Row, Row Your Boat
When You Wish Upon a Star
I'll See You in My Dreams
Chiquita Banana
Your Cheatin' Heart
Sparrow in the Treetop
Rock Around the Clock
That Old Flying Machine
The Man on the Flying Trapeze
School Days
Take Me Out to the Ball Game
Johnson Rag
Sugarfoot Rag
Chicago (That Toddling Town)
Pistol Packin' Mama
Boola Boola
Honeysuckle Rose
Volare
Quando Quando Quando (Tell Me When)
San Antonio Rose
Ragtime Cowboy Joe
Chattanooga Choo Choo
The Trolley Song
"Pep Talk"/Sing Sing Sing
Goody Goody
"Pep Talk"/Pistol Packin' Mama
Any Bonds Today
Music Music Music! (Put Another Nickel In)
It's Only a Paper Moon
Melody Time
When Irish Eyes Are Smiling
Heartaches
Night and Day
The Band Played On
Rose O'Day (The Filla-Ga-Dusha Song)
The Wabash Cannonball
"Pep Talk"/Pistol Packin' Mama
The Halls Of Montezuma
Jingle Bell Rock
I'll Never Say "Never Again" Again
Million Dollar Baby
Shine on Harvest Moon
Carolina in the Morning
You Must Have Been a Beautiful Baby
Jimmy Crack Corn
Any Bonds Today
Rose O'Day (The Filla-Ga-Dusha Song)
Michael Row the Boat Ashore
Three Blind Mice
Ramona
Mona Lisa
Bye Bye Baby
My Baby Just Cares for Me
Five Foot Two Eyes of Blue
If You Knew Susie Like I Know Susie
That's Amore
The Music Goes 'Round And Around
Jeepers Creepers
Some Sunday Morning
Alexander's Ragtime Band
Any Bonds Today
I Don't Want to Set the World on Fire
Oh What a Gal
The Wabash Cannonball
My Bonnie
Chicago (That Toddling Town)
Rose O'Day (The Filla-Ga-Dusha Song)

References

1996 albums
Outsider music albums